Crazy Legs is a studio album by Jeff Beck and the Big Town Playboys, released on 29 June 1993. The recording is an album of Gene Vincent songs. The album is considered to be a tribute to Gene Vincent and His Blue Caps, and in particular to Vincent's early guitarist Cliff Gallup, who Beck recognized as his biggest influence.

The album peaked at No. 171 on the Billboard 200 chart.

Track listing 

 "Race with the Devil" (Gene Vincent, Sheriff Tex Davis) – 2:00
 "Cruisin'" (Gene Vincent, Sheriff Tex Davis) – 2:22
 "Crazy Legs" (Danny Wolfe, Jerry Reed) – 2:03
 "Double Talkin' Baby" (Danny Wolfe, Jerry Reed) – 2:15
 "Woman Love" (Jack Rhodes) – 2:35
 "Lotta Lovin'" (Bernice Bedwell) – 2:04
 "Catman" (Gene Vincent, Sheriff Tex Davis) – 2:24
 "Pink Thunderbird" (Paul Peek, Sheriff Tex Davis) – 2:30
 "Baby Blue" (Gene Vincent, Bobby Jones) – 2:36
 "You Better Believe" (Cliff Gallup) – 2:09
 "Who Slapped John?" (Gene Vincent, Sheriff Tex Davis) – 1:55
 "Say Mama" (Johnny Earl, Johnny Meeks) – 2:13
 "Red Blue Jeans and a Pony Tail" (Jack Rhodes, Sheriff Tex Davis) – 2:18
 "Five Feet of Lovin'" (Buck Peddy, Mel Tillis) – 2:11
 "B-I-Bickey-Bi-Bo-Bo-Go" (Don Carter, Dub Nalls, Jack Rhodes) – 2:12
 "Blues Stay Away from Me" (Alton Delmore, Henry Glover, Rabon Delmore, Wayne Raney) – 2:24
 "Pretty Pretty Baby" (Danny Wolfe) – 2:26
 "Hold Me, Hug Me, Rock Me" (Gene Vincent, Sheriff Tex Davis) – 2:15

Personnel 

 Jeff Beck  -  lead guitars
The Big Town Playboys
 Mike Sanchez  -  vocals, piano
 Adrian Utley  -  rhythm guitar
 Ian Jennings  -  upright bass, backing vocals
 Clive Deamer  -  drums, backing vocals
with:
 Leo Green  -  tenor saxophone on "Say Mama"
Nick Lunt - baritone saxophone on "Say Mama"
Tony Rivers - backing vocals on "Baby Blue"
Technical
Leif Mases - engineer
David Saunders & Lance Miles - Studio & Backline Techs
Stan Watts - cover illustration

Additional notes 
Catalogue: (CD) Epic 53562

References 

Jeff Beck albums
1993 albums
Rockabilly albums
Epic Records albums
Tribute albums
Covers albums